Francis Nicholson (1655–1728) was a British military officer and colonial governor.

Francis Nicholson may also refer to:

Francis Nicholson (painter) (1753–1844), English painter
Francis Joseph Nicholson, Bishop of Roman Catholic Archdiocese of Corfu, Zakynthos and Cephalonia

See also
Frank Nicholson (disambiguation)